In general topology, the pseudo-arc is the simplest nondegenerate hereditarily indecomposable continuum.  The pseudo-arc is an arc-like homogeneous continuum, and played a central role in the classification of homogeneous planar continua. R. H. Bing proved that, in a certain well-defined sense, most continua in Rn, n ≥ 2, are homeomorphic to the pseudo-arc.

History 

In 1920, Bronisław Knaster and Kazimierz Kuratowski asked whether a nondegenerate homogeneous continuum in the Euclidean plane R2 must be a Jordan curve. In 1921, Stefan Mazurkiewicz asked whether a nondegenerate continuum in R2 that is homeomorphic to each of its nondegenerate subcontinua must be an arc. In 1922, Knaster discovered the first example of a hereditarily indecomposable continuum K, later named the pseudo-arc, giving a negative answer to a Mazurkiewicz question. In 1948, R. H. Bing proved that Knaster's continuum is homogeneous, i.e. for any two of its points there is a homeomorphism taking one to the other. Yet also in 1948, Edwin Moise showed that Knaster's continuum is homeomorphic to each of its non-degenerate subcontinua. Due to its resemblance to the fundamental property of the arc, namely, being homeomorphic to all its nondegenerate subcontinua, Moise called his example M a pseudo-arc. Bing's construction is a modification of Moise's construction of M, which he had first heard described in a lecture. In 1951, Bing proved that all hereditarily indecomposable arc-like continua are homeomorphic — this implies that Knaster's K, Moise's M, and Bing's B are all homeomorphic. Bing also proved that the pseudo-arc is typical among the continua in a Euclidean space of dimension at least 2 or an infinite-dimensional separable Hilbert space. Bing and F. Burton Jones constructed a decomposable planar continuum that admits an open map onto the circle, with each point preimage homeomorphic to the pseudo-arc, called the circle of pseudo-arcs. Bing and Jones also showed that it is homogeneous. In 2016 Logan Hoehn and Lex Oversteegen classified all planar homogeneous continua, up to a homeomorphism, as the circle, pseudo-arc and circle of pseudo-arcs. In 2019 Hoehn and Oversteegen showed that the pseudo-arc is topologically the only, other than the arc, hereditarily equivalent planar continuum, thus providing a complete solution to the planar case of Mazurkiewicz's problem from 1921.

Construction 

The following construction of the pseudo-arc follows .

Chains 
At the heart of the definition of the pseudo-arc is the concept of a chain, which is defined as follows:

A chain is a finite collection of open sets  in a metric space such that  if and only if   The elements of a chain are called its links, and a chain is called an ε-chain if each of its links has diameter less than ε.

While being the simplest of the type of spaces listed above, the pseudo-arc is actually very complex.  The concept of a chain being crooked (defined below) is what endows the pseudo-arc with its complexity.  Informally, it requires a chain to follow a certain recursive zig-zag pattern in another chain.  To 'move' from the mth link of the larger chain to the nth, the smaller chain must first move in a crooked manner from the mth link to the (n-1)th link, then in a crooked manner to the (m+1)th link, and then finally to the nth link.

More formally:

Let  and  be chains such that

Then  is crooked in

Pseudo-arc 

For any collection C of sets, let  denote the union of all of the elements of C.  That is, let

The pseudo-arc is defined as follows:

Let p and q be distinct points in the plane and  be a sequence of chains in the plane such that for each i,

the first link of  contains p and the last link contains q,
the chain  is a -chain,

Let

Then P is a pseudo-arc.

Notes

References 

 
 
 
 
 
 
 
 
 
 
 
 
 
 
 

Continuum theory